Osomatsu may refer to:
 Osomatsu-kun, a 1962 Japanese manga series
 Osomatsu-kun: Hachamecha Gekijō, a 1988 video game based on the manga
 Mr. Osomatsu, a 2015 anime series based on the manga
 List of Mr. Osomatsu episodes